The 1986 Borders Regional Council election for the Borders Regional Council took place on Thursday 8 May 1986, alongside elections to the various regional councils across Scotland.

Independents won 14 of the council's 23 seats.

Aggregate results

References

1986 Scottish local elections
1986